Khaled Ali Hamieh (born 7 June 1981) is a Lebanese singer, DJ, and former footballer. 

He played all his career for Nejmeh as a defender, and has been capped 29 times for the Lebanon national team, scoring twice. Following his retirement from football, Hamieh became a singer and DJ.

Football career

Club
Hamieh signed for Lebanese Premier League side Nejmeh's youth sector on 19 February 1997. He played for the senior team between 1998 and 2014.

International
Hamieh scored his first international goal for Lebanon in a 1–1 home draw against North Korea during a 2004 AFC Asian Cup qualification match on 3 November 2003.

Music career
Following his retirement from football, Hamieh pursued a career in the music industry, working as a singer and DJ.

Career statistics

International 
Scores and results list Lebanon's goal tally first.

Honours
Individual
 Lebanese Premier League Team of the Season: 2002–03, 2003–04, 2005–06

References

External links
 
 

1981 births
Living people
Lebanese footballers
People from Baalbek District
Association football fullbacks
Lebanese Premier League players
Nejmeh SC players
Lebanon international footballers
21st-century Lebanese male singers
Lebanese DJs